Wang Bing may refer to:

Wang Bing (canoeist) (born 1978), Chinese Olympic canoer
Wang Bing (director) (born 1967), Chinese documentary film director
Bing Wang (producer) (born 1961), Taiwanese music producer